In music, the dynamics of a piece is the variation in loudness between notes or phrases. Dynamics are indicated by specific musical notation, often in some detail. However, dynamics markings still require interpretation by the performer depending on the musical context: for instance, the forte marking  (meaning loud) in one part of a piece might have quite different objective loudness in another piece or even a different section of the same piece. The execution of dynamics also extends beyond loudness to include changes in timbre and sometimes tempo rubato.

Purpose and interpretation

Dynamics are one of the expressive elements of music. Used effectively, dynamics help musicians sustain variety and interest in a musical performance, and communicate a particular emotional state or feeling.

There are many factors affecting the interpretation of a dynamic marking. For instance, the middle of a musical phrase will normally be played louder than the beginning or end, to ensure the phrase is properly shaped, even where a passage is marked  throughout. Similarly, in multi-part music, some voices will naturally be played louder than others, for instance, to emphasize the melody and the bass line, even if a whole passage is marked at one dynamic level. Some instruments are naturally louder than others – for instance, a tuba playing piano will likely be louder than a guitar playing fortissimo, while a high-pitched instrument like the piccolo playing in its upper register can usually sound loud even when its actual decibel level is lower than that of other instruments.

Dynamic markings

The two basic dynamic indications in music are:
  or piano, meaning "quiet".
  or forte, meaning "loud or strong".

More subtle degrees of loudness or softness are indicated by:
 , standing for mezzo-piano, meaning "moderately quiet".
 , standing for mezzo-forte, meaning "moderately loud".
 , standing for più piano and meaning "more quiet". 
 , standing for più forte and meaning "more loud". 

Use of up to three consecutive s or s is also common:
 , standing for pianissimo and meaning "very quiet".
 , standing for fortissimo and meaning "very loud".
  ("triple piano"), standing for pianississimo and meaning "very very quiet".
  ("triple forte"), standing for fortississimo and meaning "very very loud".

{| style="text-align:center"
|}

Changes

Three Italian words are used to show gradual changes in volume:

 crescendo (abbreviated ) translates as "increasing" (literally "growing")
 decrescendo (abbreviated to ) translates as "decreasing".
 diminuendo (abbreviated ) translates as "diminishing".

Signs sometimes referred to as "hairpins" are also used to stand for these words (See image). If the angle lines open up, then the indication is to get louder; if they close gradually, the indication is to get softer. The following notation indicates music starting moderately strong, then becoming gradually stronger and then gradually quieter:

Hairpins are usually written below the staff (or between the two staves in a grand staff), but are sometimes found above, especially in music for singers or in music with multiple melody lines being played by a single performer. Word directions can be extended with dashes to indicate over what time the event should occur, which may be as long as multiple pages. The word morendo ("dying") is also sometimes used for a gradual reduction in dynamics (and tempo).

Sudden changes in dynamics may be notated by adding the word subito (meaning "suddenly") as a prefix or suffix to the new dynamic notation. Subito piano (abbreviated  or ) ("suddenly soft") indicates that the dynamics quickly, almost abruptly, lower the volume to approximately the  range. It is often purposefully used to subvert the listener's expectation and will signify an intimate expression. Although it uses the piano  dynamic symbol, the performer has slight freedom in their interpretation, causing it to vary based on the preceding loudness or character of the piece. Likewise, subito can be used to mark suddenly louder changes, like subito forte , or subito fortissimo , however in these cases it's usually only used to add a particular amount of accent to one note or chord. If subito is used to note a sudden change to an entire louder passage, something like  or  should be used to leave out any ambiguity.

Accented notes are typically notated with the accent sign > above or below the note, giving it a general emphasis relative to the current dynamics. A harder and shorter emphasis is usually marked with the marcato mark ^ above the note instead. If a very particular emphasis is needed instead, it can be marked with a variation of subito, forzando/forzato or fortepiano.

How these should be interpreted and played in the music is up to the judgement of the performer, but a rule of thumb is that a forzato/forzando can be considered as a variation on marcato while subito forzando/forzato can be considered a variation on marcato with added tenuto.

The fortepiano notation  indicates a forte followed immediately by piano. By contrast,  is an abbreviation for poco forte, literally "a little loud" but (according to Brahms) meaning with the character of forte, but the sound of piano, though rarely used because of possible confusion with pianoforte.

Extreme dynamic markings

Extreme dynamic markings imply an extreme range of loudness, or, alternatively, imply an extremely subtle distinction between very small differences of loudness within a normal range. This kind of usage is most common in orchestral works from the late 19th century onwards. Generally, these markings are supported by the orchestration of the work, with heavy forte markings brought to life by having many loud instruments like brass and percussion playing at once.

 In Holst's The Planets,  occurs twice in "Mars" and once in "Uranus", often punctuated by organ.
 Tchaikovsky marks a bassoon solo  (6 s) in his Pathétique Symphony and uses  in passages of his 1812 Overture and his Fifth Symphony. Tchaikovsky at least once uses fffff, in his early poem Tempest (1873).
 The baritone passage "Era la notte" from Verdi's opera Otello uses , though the same spot is marked  in the full score.
 Igor Stravinsky used  at the end of the finale of the 1919 Firebird Suite.
 Sergei Rachmaninoff uses  in his Prelude in C, Op. 3 No. 2.

History
On Music, one of the Moralia attributed to the philosopher Plutarch in the first century AD, suggests that ancient Greek musical performance included dynamic transitions – though dynamics receive far less attention in the text than does rhythm or harmony.

The Renaissance composer Giovanni Gabrieli was one of the first to indicate dynamics in music notation, but dynamics were used sparingly by composers until the late 18th century. J.S. Bach used some dynamic terms, including forte, piano, più piano, and pianissimo (although written out as full words), and in some cases it may be that  was considered to mean pianissimo in this period.

The fact that the harpsichord could play only "terraced" dynamics (either loud or soft, but not in between), and the fact that composers of the period did not mark gradations of dynamics in their scores, has led to the "somewhat misleading suggestion that baroque dynamics are 'terraced dynamics'," writes Robert Donington. In fact, baroque musicians constantly varied dynamics: in 1752, Johann Joachim Quantz wrote that "Light and shade must be constantly introduced ... by the incessant interchange of loud and soft." In addition to this, the harpsichord in fact becomes louder or softer depending on the thickness of the musical texture (four notes are louder than two). This allowed composers like J.S. Bach to build dynamics directly into their compositions, without the need for notation.

In the Romantic period, composers greatly expanded the vocabulary for describing dynamic changes in their scores. In the slow movement of Brahms's trio for violin, horn and piano (Opus 40), he uses the expressions , molto piano, and quasi niente to express different qualities of quiet.

An example of how effective contrasting dynamics can be may be found in the overture to Smetana’s opera The Bartered Bride.  The fast scurrying quavers played pianissimo by the second violins form a sharply differentiated background to the incisive thematic statement played fortissimo by the firsts.

Interpretation by notation programs 
In some music notation programs, there are default MIDI key velocity values associated with these indications, but more sophisticated programs allow users to change these as needed. These defaults are listed in the following table for some applications, including Apple's Logic Pro 9 (2009–2013), Avid's Sibelius 5 (2007–2009), musescore.org's MuseScore 3.0 (2019), MakeMusic's Finale 26 (2018-2021), and Musitek's SmartScore X2 Pro (2016) and 64 Pro. (2021). MIDI specifies the range of key velocities as an integer between 0 and 127:

The velocity effect on volume depends on the particular instrument. For instance, a grand piano has a much greater volume range than a recorder.

Relation to audio dynamics 
The introduction of modern recording techniques has provided alternative ways to control the dynamics of music. Dynamic range compression is used to control the dynamic range of a recording, or a single instrument. This can affect loudness variations, both at the micro- and macro scale. In many contexts, the meaning of the term dynamics is therefore not immediately clear. To distinguish between the different aspects of dynamics, the term performed dynamics can be used to refer to the aspects of music dynamics that is controlled exclusively by the performer.

See also

 Accent (music)
 Glossary of musical terminology

Notes

References

Musical notation
Musical terminology
Elements of music